Bassecourt railway station is a railway station in the former municipality of Bassecourt, now part of Haute-Sorne, in the Swiss canton of Jura. It is an intermediate stop on the standard gauge Delémont–Delle line of Swiss Federal Railways.

Services 
The following services stop at Bassecourt, combining for half-hourly service in both directions:

 RegioExpress: hourly service between Meroux or Delle and Biel/Bienne.
 Basel S-Bahn : hourly service between Porrentruy and Olten.

References

External links 
 
 

Railway stations in the canton of Jura
Swiss Federal Railways stations